This is a list of diplomatic missions of Malaysia. Malaysia's foreign ministry started in 1956 - a year before the country's independence - when Malaysia's Father of Independence established its offices at the Sultan Abdul Samad Building in Kuala Lumpur. Then, it was one of only four ministries established by the late Tunku Abdul Rahman.
The Ministry of Foreign Affairs started with a staff of eleven British and Australian-trained foreign service officers. It initially had missions in London, Canberra, New Delhi, Tokyo, Bangkok, and Washington, growing to fourteen missions in 1963, 21 missions in 1965 and 106 missions by 2008. In those early days, the Permanent Mission of Malaysia to the UN in New York also doubled up as the Embassy of Malaysia to the United States.

Current missions

Africa

Americas

Asia

Europe

Oceania

Multilateral organisations

Closed missions

Africa

Asia

See also
Foreign relations of Malaysia
List of Ambassadors and High Commissioners of Malaysia
List of diplomatic missions in Malaysia
Visa policy of Malaysia
Visa requirements for Malaysian citizens

Notes

References

External links
 Ministry of Foreign Affairs of Malaysia

 
Malaysia
Diplomatic missions